DZIP (864 AM) Radyo Palaweño is a radio station owned and operated by iTransmission, Inc. The station's studio and transmitter are located at the 2nd Floor, Dimalanta Bldg., 84 Rizal Ave., Brgy. Magkakaibigan, Puerto Princesa.

The station is manned by broadcasters of the defunct DYPR, Palawan's pioneer station which was acquired by ABS-CBN from Palawan Broadcasting Corporation & relaunched as Radyo Patrol in October 2011.

References

Radio stations in Puerto Princesa
Radio stations established in 2011